Slab Cabin Run is an  tributary of Spring Creek in Centre County, Pennsylvania in the United States.

Slab Cabin Run joins Spring Creek at Houserville.

Water from Slab Cabin Run flows via Spring Creek to Bald Eagle Creek, the West Branch Susquehanna River, the Susquehanna River, and ultimately Chesapeake Bay.

See also
List of rivers of Pennsylvania

References

Rivers of Pennsylvania
Tributaries of the West Branch Susquehanna River
Rivers of Centre County, Pennsylvania